Sardrud-e Olya Rural District is a rural district (dehestan) in Sardrud District, Razan County, Hamadan Province, Iran. At the 2006 census, its population was 11,354, in 2,478 families. The rural district has 13 villages.

References 

Rural Districts of Hamadan Province
Razan County